I. spicata may refer to:
 Indigofera spicata, a plant species
 Inquisitor spicata, a sea snail species
 Ipomopsis spicata, the spiked ipomopsis, a flowering plant species in the genus Ipomopsis

See also
 Spicata (disambiguation)